The Frauen DFB-Pokal 1999–2000 was the 20th season of the cup competition, Germany's second-most important title in women's football. The first round of the competition was held on 22–25 August 1999. In the final which was held in Berlin on 6 May 2000 FFC Frankfurt defeated Sportfreunde Siegen 2–1, thus defending their title from the previous seasons and claiming their second title.

1st round

* Windhorst Drosendorf and Ahrbach withdrew their teams. Nürnberg and Saarbücken thus advanced to the next round.

2nd round

* Hertha Zehlendorf withdrew their team. Brauweiler Pulheim thus advanced to the next round.

Quarter-finals

Semi-finals

Final

DFB-Pokal Frauen seasons
Pokal
Fra